Hans Walter Peter Nisblé (28 March 1945 – 11 January 2022) was a German politician. He died on 11 January 2022, at the age of 76.

References

1945 births
2022 deaths
20th-century German politicians
21st-century German politicians
Social Democratic Party of Germany politicians
Members of the Abgeordnetenhaus of Berlin
Mayors of places in Germany
Politicians from Berlin